Quality Road (foaled March 23, 2006, in Virginia) is an American Thoroughbred racehorse.

Background
Quality Road was bred and owned by Edward P. Evans. He was sired by Elusive Quality, who also sired 2004 Kentucky Derby/Preakness Stakes winner Smarty Jones and 2008 Breeders' Cup Classic winner Raven's Pass. His dam is Kobla, a daughter of 1983 Australian Champion Racehorse of the Year Strawberry Road.

Racing career

2009: three-year-old season
Trained by Jimmy Jerkens, Quality Road raced in Florida in early 2009, where his wins in the Fountain of Youth Stakes and Grade 1 Florida Derby made him a favorite for the Kentucky Derby. However, he suffered two injuries. The first was a quarter crack on his right hind foot the day he won the Florida Derby. In April, he suffered a second quarter crack on his right front foot. As a result, he missed all three legs of the U.S. Triple Crown series.

In mid June, owner Edward Evans transferred the colt to the care of trainer Todd Pletcher. On August 3, 2009, Quality Road made his first start since his injury, winning the Amsterdam Stakes at Saratoga Race Course in a track record time of 1:13.74 for six and a half furlongs.

On August 29, 2009, Quality Road finished third to Summer Bird in the Travers Stakes. He followed that with a second to Summer Bird in the October 10 Jockey Gold Cup.  Later that month, Quality Road was pre-entered in the Breeders' Cup Classic, in the hopes that his running style would be well-suited to the polytrack at Santa Anita Park.

On November 7, 2009, Quality Road became the first horse to scratch at the gate in the Breeders' Cup Classic.  After he refused to load into the starting gate, kicking with his hind legs on two or three occasions, the track crew blindfolded him and he kicked wildly, scraping his hocks on the gate and forcing the scratch.

2010: four-year-old season
On January 3, Quality Road made his 4-year-old debut in the Grade III Hal's Hope Stakes as the odds-on favorite. He won by  lengths.

On February 6, he broke his own track record when he won the Donn Handicap with John Velazquez riding. Quality Road finished the race in 1:47.49 to break the record of 1:47.72, which he set when he won the 2009 Florida Derby. He took control of the race at the stretch and  began to pull away at the eighth pole. Dry Martini, the 2009 Suburban Handicap winner, was second.

In an interview with the Thoroughbred Times after the race, Pletcher said he would point the colt for the Metropolitan Handicap and the "big races" at Saratoga Race Course "before the Breeders' Cup Classic" in fall 2010. He also complimented Quality Road's performance, saying, “He’s got a very high cruising speed and can go :46 and 1:09 and still keep going. Not many horses can do that and he was spotting weight to all those horses, six pounds or more.

Quality Road earned a 121 Beyer Speed Figure in the Donn Handicap, then the highest speed figure awarded for a race over one mile since 2005.

In the May 31 Metropolitan Handicap , Quality Road was installed as favorite and held off Musket Man to win in a very fast time of 1:33.11. On August 7, 2010, he ran 2nd in the Whitney Handicap, beaten a head by eventual Breeders' Cup Classic winner Blame. On September 4, 2010, he won the Woodward Stakes by  lengths.

Quality Road ran only once more. On November 6, 2010, he started in the Breeders' Cup Classic at Churchill Downs. Breaking from the 1 post, he remained on the rail throughout the race and finished 12th and last behind Blame. After the race, it was determined that the horse had an abscess and that was the reason he was pulled up.

Stud record
Quality Road was then retired to Lane's End Farm in Versailles, Kentucky. His stud fee for 2011 was $35,000. His first crop raced in 2014, most notable runners were 2014 Breeders' Cup Juvenile Turf winner Hootenanny, multiple graded stakes winner Blofeld, and stakes winner Overprepared. He was the leading first crop sire by earnings in 2014.

He was not as successful with his second crop that started racing in 2015, but in 2016 he rebounded by leading the third crop sire list. His outstanding runner of 2016 was Abel Tasman, who went on to win the 2017 Kentucky Oaks.

Quality Road's top progeny includes

Notable progeny
c = colt, f = filly, g = gelding

Racing record

Pedigree

References

 Quality Road's pedigree and partial racing stats

External links
 Video at YouTube of Quality Road winning the 2009 Florida Derby

2006 racehorse births
Racehorses bred in Virginia
Racehorses trained in the United States
Horse racing track record setters
Thoroughbred family 13-c